Riding is a homonym of two distinct English words:

From the word ride
 In equestrianism, riding a horse
 Riding animal, animal bred or trained for riding
 Riding hall, building designed for indoor horse riding

From Old English *þriðing
 Riding (division), administrative division of a county, or similar district
 Electoral district (Canada), Canadian term for an electoral district
 Riding association, Canadian political party organization at the riding level
 Riding officer, name once used for customs officials who patrolled for smugglers on beaches and other informal landing spots
 Common Riding, event celebrated in some Scottish towns to commemorate the guarding by local men of the town's common-land boundaries

Other uses
 Riding, Northumberland, a former parish, now in Broomhaugh and Riding, England
 Riding (surname)
 "Riding", a 2022 song by Bently and No Money Enterprise

See also
 
 Ridin' (disambiguation)